Morris Katz (born Moshe Katz on March 5, 1932 – November 12, 2010) was a Polish-American painter. He holds two Guinness World Records as the world's fastest painter and the world's most prolific artist. He has also been called the "King of Schlock Art" and the "King of Toilet Paper Art" because of a novel means of painting he developed using a palette knife and toilet tissue instead of a paintbrush.

On October 1, 1985 Morris wrested the Guinness World Record from none other than Pablo Picasso himself as the world's most prolific artist at the Art Students League on 57th Street in New York City.

As a Holocaust survivor and symbol of gratitude to the United States  immediately after the assassination of President Kennedy, Morris undertook his longest and most dear project The President Collection. Morris who is world famous for completing beautiful portraits within minutes using his Instant Art method picked up his brush painting each US president spending six years and an average of 200 hours on each Presidential portrait using the “Old Master” style.

Each Portrait includes the US flag.
It is the first of its kind collection displaying the exact amount of stars per colony on each flag per president.
The US presidents was the apple of his eye, with millions of postcards sold to collectors throughout the world. 
In 1965, the Vatican commissioned Morris, a world famous artist and Holocaust Survivor, to paint the portrait of Pope Paul VI. 3 million copies of this portrait were sold worldwide.

Early life 
Katz was born in 1932 in Galicia, Poland. At age 13 he studied under Dr. Hans Fokler of the Munich Academy. During the Holocaust, Morris suffered unspeakable horrors in Nazi concentration camps and lost most of his family. After World War II, he lived for a while in a displaced persons camp, where he earned a diploma in carpentry, and he said later that toilet paper was his "diploma in art."

He moved to the United States in 1949, when he took a job in carpentry while maintaining a sideline with his art. Morris began working as a carpenter after struggling to find a job where he was able to keep Shabbos. While working on his unpublished Dictionary of Color in 1956, he decided to try painting with his palette knife instead of his brushes. After some time he also began experimenting with the use of rags; when he ran out of rags he turned to toilet tissue. He would use up almost 10000 toilet paper rolls each year for his paintings.

As of February 2007, over his career he had painted more than 280,000 paintings.

Over his long career, in addition to being a world famous artist he established himself as a painter, comedian and television personality hosting and Producing over 600 TV shows using his Instant Art Method.

An obituary  described him as "creating 'instant art' and entertaining generations of guests in the old Borscht Belt hotels.

Instant Art 
On May 9, 1988, Katz painted a 12- by 16-inch canvas of a child in just 30 seconds setting a new Guinness World Record. Katz described his method of painting as "Instant Art," because of how quickly he would complete these paintings.

In a 1987 event to benefit the Boy Scouts of America, Katz completed 103 paintings (selling 55 of them on the spot) in 12 hours. He is listed as a human oddity in Ripley's Believe It Or Not because of his ability to paint full works of art in less than five minutes.

A 2003 review of a serious painting  said "Normally this artist's works are notable only for their carefree and speedy execution, but this painting is a welcome exception."

Death 
Katz died on November 12, 2010 after suffering a stroke.  He was 78.

References

External links
 Morris Katz Foundation
 NY Daily News, Morris Katz obituary

1932 births
20th-century American painters
American male painters
21st-century American painters
21st-century American male artists
Jewish American artists
2010 deaths
21st-century American Jews
20th-century American male artists